NGFI-A-binding protein 1 is a protein that in humans is encoded by the NAB1 gene.

Interactions
NAB1 has been shown to interact with Zif268.

References

Further reading

Human proteins